The 2018–19 Eerste Divisie, known as Keuken Kampioen Divisie for sponsorship reasons, was the sixty-third season of Eerste Divisie since its establishment in 1955. It began in August 2018 and ended in May 2019 with the returns of the finals of the promotion/relegation play-offs, involving also the 16th- and 17th-placed teams from the 2018–19 Eredivisie.

Teams 
A total of 20 teams are taking part in the league. Fortuna Sittard gained promotion to the Eredivisie, and was replaced by FC Twente, who finished bottom in the 2017–18 Eredivisie. FC Emmen and De Graafschap won the post-season playoff, and are replaced in the 2018–19 Eerste Divisie by Roda JC and Sparta Rotterdam.

At an extraordinary KNVB federation meeting on June 7, 2018, representatives of amateur and professional football reached an agreement to renew the football pyramid in the 2019–20 season. Part of the Agreement was that no promotion/relegation would take place between the Eerste and Tweede Divisie this season.

Personnel and kits

Standings

Period tables

Period 1

Period 2

Period 3

Period 4

Results

Positions by round 
The table lists the positions of teams after completion of each round.

Season statistics

Top scorers 

Updated to match(es) played on 3 May 2019.
Source: nos.nl

Hat-tricks(+) 

Updated to match(es) played on 3 May 2019.

Assists 

Updated to match(es) played on 3 May 2019.
Source: nos.nl

Promotion/relegation play-offs 
Ten teams, two from the Eredivisie and eight from the Eerste Divisie, play for two spots in the 2019–20 Eredivisie, the remaining eight teams playing in the 2019–20 Eerste Divisie.

Key: * = Play-off winners, (a) = Wins because of away goals rule, (e) = Wins after extra time in second leg, (p) = Wins after penalty shoot-out.

References

External links 
  

Eerste Divisie seasons
Netherlands
2018–19 in Dutch football